Andy Kulberg (April 30, 1944 – January 28, 2002) was an American musician notable for his bass playing with the groups Blues Project and Seatrain.

He was born in Buffalo, New York, and grew up in Amherst, New York. In 1965, he became a founding member of the "Blues Project", a popular New York City folk rock band, along with Al Kooper, Danny Kalb, Steve Katz and Roy Blumenfeld. Kulberg was the band's bass guitarist, also known for his electric flute virtuosity. He claimed to have invented the electric flute by drilling a hole and inserting an electric pickup.

He later formed and was a member of "Seatrain," the first production by Sir George Martin after the breakup of the Beatles, which Kulberg formed with Blumenfeld after the breakup of Blues Project in early 1969. Peter Rowan and Richard Greene were among the members of Seatrain.

During the 1970’s to 1980’s he worked scoring and performing music for TV such as Starksky and Hutch, and B.A.D. CATS which starred Michelle Pfeiffer. He delved into a musical score for the B movie Cardiac Arrest about a medical black market for human hearts. 

For twenty-five years, Kulberg worked in Fairfax, California as a musician and composer, collaborating with Chris Michie, while at the same time owning and operating, along with Michie, the music production company Kulberg/Michie Music. Their most notable contributions under this name were to Brøderbund's Kid Pix Studio and Kid Pix Studio Deluxe, creating all of the music clips that the user could choose from to go along with their Moopie, Stampimation, Digital Puppet show, or, in the Macintosh version of Kid Pix Studio Deluxe, their SlideShow presentation as background music. Most of those same music clips were also made available in Kid Pix Deluxe 3 (including the OS X remaster, Kid Pix Deluxe 3X, and the completely three-dimensional upgrade, Kid Pix 3D) and Kid Pix Deluxe 4.

Kulberg died of lymphoma in January 2002. On October 18, 2007, he was inducted into the Buffalo Music Hall of Fame. Kulberg is survived by his wife Lorie, three sons, three grandsons, and one granddaughter.

References

External links 
 Chris Michie
 Blues Project - Flute Thing
 Andy Kulberg -- played flute, bass with Blues Project, Seatrain

1944 births
2002 deaths
Musicians from Buffalo, New York
American male composers
American flautists
20th-century American bass guitarists
People from Fairfax, California
American male bass guitarists
Guitarists from New York (state)
Guitarists from California
20th-century American composers
20th-century American male musicians
The Blues Project members
Seatrain (band) members
20th-century flautists